The Fountain of Justice is a historic landmark in Bacolod, Negros Occidental, Philippines. It marks the location where the house of Jose Ruiz de Luzurriaga used to stand. It was in this house that the surrender of Bacolod by Spanish authorities to the Filipino forces of General Aniceto Lacson took place on November 6, 1898, during the Negros Revolution. Luzurriaga acted as mediator between the two belligerents. Colonel Isidro de Castro, Spanish governor of Negros, signed the surrender document on behalf of the Spanish forces. The landmark now lies in front of the old Bacolod City Hall.

The plaza and fountain area is also a place for recreation, political, spiritual and cultural activities and is illuminated at night. The fountain is a meeting place for rallies and protesters of many organizations, private, public and labor movements and political sectors. The fountain was the site of the celebration of the 66th Charter Anniversary of Bacolod City.

See also
 Negros Occidental Provincial Capitol
 Capitol Park and Lagoon
 Capitol Central
 Bacolod Public Plaza

References

Plazas in the Philippines
Buildings and structures in Bacolod
National monuments of the Philippines
Landmarks in the Philippines
Tourist attractions in Bacolod